Voetbal Vereniging Sneek Wit Zwart (abbreviated SWZ) is a football club from Sneek, Netherlands. It currently plays in the Derde Klasse, eight tier on Dutch football.

History
Sneek Wit Zwart was founded on 26 November 1910 as Quick as a club for the working class. In 1912 Brunio merged into the club to become Rood-Blauw. In 1914 the club changed names to VV Sneek. In 1922 Sparta merged into the club and in 1922 the members of Voorwaarts joined.

21st century 
In 2000, VV Sneek almost went bankrupt. It was kept out of insolvency by the Municipality of Sneek. In 2008, the club merged Wit Zwart Sneek to become Sneek Zwart Wit. In anticipation of a possible merger the youth departments of both clubs had already collaborated since 2005. 

Sherida Spitse, the most capped player for the Netherlands women's national football team, started playing football at VV Sneek in 2004. She joined the international squad in 2006 and left Sneek in 2007.

In 2012, Zwart Wit Sneek reached the third round of the 2012–13 KNVB Cup, in which it lost 1–4 to AZ Alkmaar.

References

 
Football clubs in the Netherlands
Football clubs in Súdwest-Fryslân
Association football clubs established in 1910
1910 establishments in the Netherlands
Sneek